Rachael Padman (born 1954) is an Australian physics lecturer at the University of Cambridge in England. From Melbourne, Padman was a graduate in electrical engineering from Monash University, Australia, and specialised in radio astronomy. After her doctoral research, she has made contributions to research in stellar evolution (the formation of stars). She is now mainly involved in administrative works in teaching. Padman is a member of the International Astronomical Union.

A trans woman, Padman underwent sex reassignment surgery in 1982 when she was undertaking a PhD in astronomy at the University of Cambridge. In 1996, she was elected a Fellow of Newnham College, one of three all-women colleges in the University of Cambridge at the time. She received opposition from some people, who argued, unsuccessfully, that Padman should not be made a Fellow as she was assigned male at birth.

Early life and education
Padman was born Russell Padman, in Melbourne, in 1954, and attended Melbourne High School in the Melbourne suburb of South Yarra. She was the school cadet captain and won the rifle-shooting prize for two consecutive years. She obtained a first degree in Electrical Engineering from Monash University in Australia. She joined research work on radio astronomy at the Commonwealth Scientific and Industrial Research Organisation Division of Radio Physics in Sydney, for two years.

In her autobiographical essay, "Rachael's Story", she discussed her lifelong gender identity as female, and one motive behind going to England was a hope for an opportunity to address her gender issues. In 1977, Padman settled in England to work for PhD in astronomy at an all-male St John's College, Cambridge, and did research at the Cavendish Laboratory in University of Cambridge. Among the first things she did on arrival in Cambridge was to approach John Randall at Charing Cross Hospital in London, who prescribed oestrogen. In 1978, she came out as transgender, and started with her PhD supervisor, Richard Hills. She said Rachael spontaneously came up as her name one morning; she initially thought about using Susan from a pupil from her primary school, before renouncing because there were already two Susans in her laboratory, including the secretary.

She received her degree in 1982. In the US, she became a Miller Research Fellow at the University of California, Berkeley, returning to the Cavendish in 1984.

Career
At the Cavendish Laboratory, Padman was appointed Deputy Project Scientist for the James Clerk Maxwell Telescope in Hawaii in 1984. She worked there for four years until she became a University Lecturer in the Department of Physics, University of Cambridge, in 1998. From 2005, she has been primarily involved in the administration of teaching in the Department of Physics. She is Director of Education in School of Physical Sciences. At Newnham, she is both teaching physics and serves as Director of Studies in Natural Sciences.

She was publicly outed in the press in 1996, when Padman was elected Fellow of Newnham College. The college statutes allowed only female members in the institute. The Principal, Dr. Onora O'Neill, knew that Padman had undergone a sex-change operation. Feminist Germaine Greer, who was a member of the college's governing body, strongly opposed the appointment, saying that Padman was a man and male. Fellows, students, and staff of Cambridge University supported Padman, and she was admitted without further opposition. Clare Longrigg published an article titled "A Sister with No Fellow Feeling" in the 25 June 1997 issue of The Guardian making charges on Padman and containing remarks attributed to Greer. The article was retracted on 19 March 1998 as information was found to be false, and the accusation made against Greer was considered groundless.

References

External links
Profile at the Cavendish Laboratory, Cambridge
Profile at Mullard Radio Astronomy Observatory, Cambridge
Profile at Newnham College, Cambridge

1954 births
Living people
Monash University alumni
Transgender women
Transgender scientists
Australian physicists
Scientists of the Cavendish Laboratory
Alumni of St John's College, Cambridge
Australian astrophysicists
Australian women physicists
Fellows of Newnham College, Cambridge
Australian LGBT scientists
Transgender academics